Mustafa İnan (born 24 January 2000) is a Turkish professional footballer who plays as a midfielder for 24 Erzincanspor.

Professional career
Mustafa joined Antalyaspor in 2012 after shining in a local school tournament, and signed his first contract with them in 2017. Mustafa made his professional debut for Antalyaspor in a 3-1 Turkish Cup loss to Kayserispor on 27 December 2017, at the age of 17.

International career
Mustafa was called up to the Turkey national under-18 football team in November 2017, but did not make an appearance at that time.

References

External links
 
 
 

2000 births
Sportspeople from Antalya
Living people
Turkish footballers
Association football midfielders
Antalyaspor footballers
24 Erzincanspor footballers
TFF Second League players
TFF Third League players